The following is a list of notable deaths in December 1998.

Entries for each day are listed alphabetically by surname. A typical entry lists information in the following sequence:
 Name, age, country of citizenship at birth, subsequent country of citizenship (if applicable), reason for notability, cause of death (if known), and reference.

December 1998

1
Aisha Abd al-Rahman, 85, Egyptian author and professor of literature, heart attack.
Janet Lewis, 99, American novelist, poet, and librettist.
Bertil Nordahl, 81, Swedish football player and manager.
Vincenzo Pappalettera, 79, Italian writer and historian.
Donald Smith, 76, Australian operatic tenor.
Freddie Young, 96, British cinematographer (Lawrence of Arabia, Doctor Zhivago, Ryan's Daughter), Oscar winner (1963, 1966, 1971).

2
Theodora Mead Abel, 99, American clinical psychologist.
Ben Guintini, 79, American baseball player.
Bob Haggart, 84, American dixieland jazz musician.
Cleopa Ilie, 86, Romanian abbot.
Mikio Oda, 93, Japanese athlete and the first Japanese Olympic gold medalist.
Brian Stonehouse, 80, British painter and SEO agent during World War II.

3
Pierre Hétu, 62, Canadian conductor, pianist and politician, cancer.
Albert Leman, 83, Soviet composer of classical music.
Mohammad Mokhtari, 56, Iranian writer, poet and activist, murdered.
George Murcell, 73, British actor.
Robert Rothschild, 86, Belgian diplomat.
Ed Widseth, 88, American football player.

4
Percy Ames, 66, English footballer.
Egil Johansen, 64, Norwegian-Swedish jazz musician.
Suzanne Jovin, 21, German-born American student, murdered.
Milton Marks, 78, American politician.
Yury Vengerovsky, 60, Ukrainian volleyball player and Olympic champion.

5
Hazel Bishop, 92, American chemist.
Jack Connor, 78, English footballer.
Jean Fenwick, 91, Trinidad-American actress.
Albert Arnold Gore, 90, American politician and father of Al Gore.
John Lions, 61, Australian computer scientist.
Cheung Tze-keung, 43, Chinese criminal, execution by firing squad.

6
César Baldaccini, 77, French sculptor.
Georges Borgeaud, 84, Swiss writer and publisher.
Robert Marasco, 62, American horror novelist and playwright, lung cancer.
Pierre Mousel, 83, Luxembourgian football player.
Peg Leg Bates, 91, American entertainer.
Radomir Šaper, 72, Yugoslav/Serbian basketball player and executive.
Hoshiar Singh, 61, Indian Army officer.
Michael Zaslow, 56, American actor, cancer.

7
John Addison, 78, British composer.
Carlos Oviedo Cavada, 71, Chilean cardinal of the Catholic Church.
Daniel Lee Corwin, 40, American serial killer, execution by lethal injection.
Voitto Hellstén, 66, Finnish sprinter and Olympic medalist.
Tim Kelly, 61, American playwright.
Martin Rodbell, 73, American scientist and Nobel prize recipient, multiple organ failure.

8
Michael Craze, 56, British actor (Doctor Who), heart attack.
Hamilton H. Howze, 89, American general and commander of the 82nd Airborne Division.
George Roden, 60, American leader of the Branch Davidian sect, heart attack.
Odo Josef Struger, 67, Austrian automation pioneer, cancer.

9
Christine Fulwylie-Bankston, 82, American poet, publisher, and civil rights activist.
Bill Looby, 67, American soccer player.
Archie Moore, 81, American boxing champion, heart failure.
Mohammad-Ja'far Pouyandeh, 44, Iranian writer and activist, murdered.

10
Wim Hora Adema, 84, Dutch children's author and feminist.
Bob Brown, 59, American gridiron football player.
Bob Dille, 81, American basketball player.
Buddy Feyne, 86, American lyricist.
Wang Ganchang, 91, Chinese nuclear physicist.
Ray Goossens, 74, Belgian artist, animator, writer and film director.
Trygve Haugeland, 84, Norwegian politician .
Kamel Messaoudi, 37, Algerian Chaabi musician, traffic collision.
Charles D. Mize, 77, United States Marine Corps officer, leukemia.
Berta Singerman, 97, Belarusian-Argentine singer and actress, cardiovascular disease.
Vida Tomšič, 85, Slovenian communist and World War II partisan fighter.

11
Jack Coleman, 74, American basketball player.
Irma Hünerfauth, 90, German painter and sculptor.
Gunnar Johansson, 79, Swedish sprint canoeist and Olympian.
André Lichnerowicz, 83, French differential geometer and mathematical physicist.
Jimmy Mackay, 54, Scottish-Australian football player.
Kavi Pradeep, 83, Indian poet and songwriter.
Chen Puru, 80, Chinese politician.
Anton Stankowski, 92, German graphic designer, photographer and painter.
Lynn Strait, 30, American singer and vocalist of band Snot, car accident.
Max Streibl, 66, German politician.

12
Max Boydston, 66, American gridiron football player.
Lawton Chiles, 68, American politician, heart attack.
Marco Denevi., 76, Argentine novelist, lawyer and journalist.
Jimmy "Orion" Ellis, 53, American singer, murdered during robbery.
Denny Galehouse, 87, American baseball player.
Willis J. Gertsch, 92, American arachnologist.
Vadim Gulyaev, 57, Russian water polo player and Olympic champion.
William A. Marra, 70, American politician.
Don Patterson, 88, American producer, animator, and director.
Mo Udall, 76, American politician, Parkinson's disease.

13
Helen Adolf, 102, Austrian–American linguist and literature scholar.
Willem den Toom, 87, Dutch politician.
Dean Fausett, 85, American painter.
Lew Grade, 91, British impresario.
Harvey Jones, 77, American gridiron football player.
Richard Thomas, 66, British admiral and Black Rod.
Ariadna Welter, 68, Mexican movie actress.
Liang Xiang, 79, Chinese politician.
Norbert Zongo, 49, Burkinabé investigative journalist, murdered.

14
Vittorio Cottafavi, 84, Italian film director and screenwriter.
Norman Fell, 74, American actor (Three's Company, The Graduate, Bullitt), bone marrow cancer.
A. Leon Higginbotham, Jr., 70, African-American civil rights advocate, author and judge, stroke.
Yuriy Hromak, 50, Ukrainian backstroke swimmer and Olympic medalist.
James A. Jensen, 80, American paleontologist.
Brian Lewis, 55, English footballer.
Annette Strauss, 74, American philanthropist and mayor of Dallas, cancer.
Will Tremper, 70, German journalist and filmmaker, heart attack.

15
Daniel Langrand, 77, French football player and coach.
Jan Meyerowitz, 85, American composer, conductor, pianist and writer.
Rowena Moore, 88, American civil rights activist.
Robert Paul, 88, French sprinter and Olympian.
Dean Peters, 40, American professional wrestler and referee, car accident.
Ján Podhradský, 82, Slovak football player.
Johnny Riddle, 93, American baseball player and coach.
Paul Rivière, 86, French Resistance fighter during World War II and politician.

16
Clay Blair, 73, American journalist and author, heart attack.
Jocelyn Crane, 89, American carcinologist.
Jean de Montrémy, 85, French industrialist, racing driver, and race car designer.
William Gaddis, 75, American novelist, prostate cancer.
Johnny Gorsica, 83, American baseball player.
Lee Tai-young, 84, Korean lawyer and judge.
Maneklal Sankalchand Thacker, 94, Indian engineer and academic.
Philip True, 50, American foreign correspondent, murdered.

17
Kevin Brennan, 78, Australian-born British-based film and television actor.
John Burns Brooksby, 83, Scottish veterinarian.
Allan D'Arcangelo, 68, American artist and printmaker.
Joseph Esherick, 86, American architect, heart failure.
Antonina Khudyakova, 81, Soviet Air Force officer during World War II.
Dorothy Nyembe, 66, South African activist and politician.
Harry Osman, 87, English football player.

18
Agustín Barboza, 85, Paraguayan singer and composer.
C. S. Chellappa, 86, Indian writer, journalist and political activist.
Lev Dyomin, 72, Soviet cosmonaut, cancer.
Mohammad Taghi Falsafi, 90, Iranian ayatollah and preacher.
Harry Haddock, 73, Scottish footballer.
Abdurajak Abubakar Janjalani, 38-39, Filipino militant, founder of Abu Sayyaf, shot.
Vinod Mishra, 51, Indian communist politician, heart attack.
Edwin E. Moise, 79, American mathematician.
Gilberto Muñoz, 75, Chilean football player.
Tadeusz Rybczynski, 75, Polish-English economist.
Max Wehrli, 89, Swiss literary scholar and germanist.

19
Garry Blaine, 65, Canadian ice hockey player.
Cully Dahlstrom, 86, American ice hockey player.
Mel Fisher, 76, American treasure hunter.
Gordon Gunter, 89, American marine biologist and fisheries scientist.
Antonio Ordóñez, 66, Spanish bullfighter, liver cancer.
Bernhard Tessmann, 86, German rocket scientist during and after World War II.
Ron Turner, 76, British illustrator and comic book artist, stroke and heart attack.
Qian Zhongshu, 88, Chinese literary scholar and writer, cancer.

20
André Dewavrin, 87, French officer and resistance member during World War II.
E. W. Etchells, 87, American sailor and sailboat designer.
Angelo Grizzetti, 82, French-Italian football player and coach.
Irene Hervey, 89, American actress, heart failure.
Alan Lloyd Hodgkin, 84, British scientist, recipient of the Nobel Prize in Physiology or Medicine.
Kazimierz Kropidłowski, 67, Polish long jumper and Olympian.
Bangalore Venkata Raman, 86, Indian astrologer.
Miklós Sárkány, 90, Hungarian water polo player and Olympic champion.

21
Roger Avon, 84, British actor.
Gilbert Charles-Picard, 85, French historian and archaeologist.
Avril Coleridge-Taylor, 95, English pianist, conductor, and composer.
Adelaide Hawley Cumming, 93, American vaudeville performer, radio host, and television personality.
Karl Denver, 67, Scottish singer, brain tumor.
Anne Ferguson, 57, Scottish physician and clinical researcher, pancreatic cancer.
Sándor Ivády, 95, Hungarian water polo player and Olympic champion.
Ernst Günther Schenck, 94, German doctor and member of the SS.
Béla Szőkefalvi-Nagy, 85, Hungarian mathematician.
Jerzy Topolski, 70, Polish historian.
Richard Turnbull, 89, British colonial governor.

22
Pedro Araya, 73, Chilean basketball player.
Leif Erickson, 92, American attorney and politician.
Virginia Graham, 86, American talk show host, heart attack.
Robert Haynes, 67, Canadian geneticist and biophysicist.
Jean Malaquais, 90, French novelist.
Subhashis Nag, 43, Indian mathematician.
Donald Soper, 95, British methodist minister and pacifist.

23
Mark Chatfield, 45, American breaststroke swimmer, lymphoma.
Jack Hilton, 77, English rugby player.
Peggy Kelman, 89, Australian aviation pioneer.
Ratnappa Kumbhar, 89, Indian independence activist.
David Manners, 98, Canadian-American actor (Dracula, The Mummy, A Bill of Divorcement).
Joe Orlando, 71, Italian American illustrator, writer and cartoonist.
Anatoly Rybakov, 87, Soviet and Russian writer.
Michelle Thomas, 30, American actress (Family Matters, The Young and the Restless, The Cosby Show) and comedian, cancer.
Pierre Vallières, 60, Québécois journalist and writer, heart failure.

24
Syl Apps, 83, Canadian ice hockey player, heart attack.
Viola Farber, 67, American choreographer and dancer.
Matt Gillies, 77, Scottish football player and manager.
Peter Janssens, 64, German musician and composer.
Daan Kagchelland, 84, Dutch sailor and Olympic champion.
William R. Perl, 92, American lawyer and psychologist.
Raemer Schreiber, 88, American physicist.
Estelle Witherspoon, 82, American artist, civil rights activist and quilter.

25
Katharina Brauren, 88, German actress.
Alfredo Covelli, 84, Italian politician.
Damita Jo DeBlanc, 68, American actress, comedian, and singer, respiratory disease.
Bryan MacLean, 52, American singer, guitarist and songwriter, heart attack.
Mike McAlary, 41, American journalist and columnist, colorectal cancer.
John McGrath, 60, English football player and manager.
Hans Oeschger, 71, Swiss climatologist.
Richard Paul, 58, American actor, cancer.
John Pulman, 75, English snooker player, domestic accident.

26
Cathal Goulding, 75, Northern Irish Republican and IRA member, cancer.
Dick Grove, 71, American musician, composer, and arranger.
Hurd Hatfield, 81, American actor, heart attack.
Helmut Mahlke, 85, German Oberstleutnant in the Luftwaffe during World War II.
Michael Sherard, 88, British fashion designer.
Ram Swarup, 78, Indian author.

27
Kevork Ajemian, 66, Lebanese-Armenian writer, journalist, novelist and activist.
Dany Bustros, 39, Lebanese belly dancer, socialite and stage actress, suicide.
Anita Hoffman, 56, American writer and activist, breast cancer.
Anne Holm, 76, Danish journalist and children's writer.
Robert S. Johnson, 78, American fighter pilot during World War II.
Joe Parker, 75, American gridiron football player.
Roy Powell, English rugby league player, heart attack.
Ralegh Radford, 98, English archaeologist and historian.
Ricardo Tormo, 46, Spanish motorcycle road racer, leukemia.

28
André Bizette-Lindet, 92, French sculptor.
Herbert Fechner, 85, East German politician.
William Frankfather, 54, American actor (Death Becomes Her, Harry and the Hendersons, Mouse Hunt), complications from liver disease.
Edgar Hovhannisyan, 68, Armenian composer.
Ron Huntington, 77, Canadian politician.
Werner Müller, 78, German composer and conductor of classical music.
Shorty Rollins, 69, American racing driver.
Robert Rosen, 64, American theoretical biologist.
Harold Schindler, 69, American journalist and historian.
Ouang Te Tchao, 93, Chinese physicist.
Mary Ann Unger, 53, American abstract sculpor, breast cancer.
Bjørn Watt-Boolsen, 75, Danish film actor.

29
Geoff Crawford, 82, Australian politician.
George Curran, 80, English rugby league football player.
Hubert Deschamps, 75, French actor, heart attack.
Phyllis Kennedy, 84, American film actress.
Jack D. Moore, 92, American set decorator.
Don Taylor, 78, American actor and film director, heart failure.

30
Joan Brossa, 79, Catalan poet, playwright and visual artist.
Jean-Claude Forest, 68, French writer and illustrator of comics, asthma.
Jack Graham, 82, American baseball player.
Walker Hancock, 97, American sculptor and teacher.
Rune Johansson, 78, Swedish ice hockey player.
Keisuke Kinoshita, 86, Japanese film director, stroke.
Johnny Moore, 64, American R&B singer with The Drifters, pneumonia.
Sam Muchnick, 93, American professional wrestling promoter.
Ansar Razak, 24, Indonesian football player, traffic collision.
Karl Heinz Rechinger, 92, Austrian botanist and phytogeographer.
Otto Wachs, 89, German sailor and Olympic medalist.
George Webb, 86, British actor.

31
George Lynn Cross, 93, American botanist and author.
H. Dunlop Dawbarn, 83, American businessman, philanthropist and politician.
Ted Glossop, Australian rugby player and coach, cancer.
Les Hammond, 90, Canadian politician.
Gene Harlow, 79, American football player and coach.
Alan Morris, 44, English football player, murdered.
Erling Norvik, 70, Norwegian politician.
Arnold Stickley, 72, English golfer.
Jerry Williams, 75, American football player and coach, leukemia.

References 

1998-12
 12